Funeral is the debut studio album by Canadian indie rock band Arcade Fire, released on September 14, 2004 by Merge Records. Preliminary recordings for Funeral were made during the course of a week in August 2003 at the Hotel2Tango in Montreal, Quebec, and the recording was completed later that year all in an analogue recording format.

The album produced five singles, with "Rebellion (Lies)" being the most successful, having peaked at #19 on the UK Singles Chart. The album was nominated for a Grammy Award in 2005 for Best Alternative Music Album. It received widespread critical acclaim and topped many year-end and decade-end lists, now being often considered one of the greatest albums of all time.  According to the website Metacritic, the album had the second most appearances on end-of-decade Top 10 lists, only behind Radiohead's Kid A. In the 2020 updated version of Rolling Stones 500 Greatest Albums of All Time, it was ranked at number 500.

Background
Funeral was largely recorded over the course of a week at the Hotel2Tango in Montreal, Quebec in August 2003. Additional recording also took place at Régine Chassagne and Win Butler's apartment, and the album was completed in 2004. The production cost of the album was estimated to be around $10,000.

The album was given its title because several band members had recently lost members of their families; Régine Chassagne's grandmother died in June 2003, Win and William Butler's grandfather (swing musician Alvino Rey) in February 2004, and Richard Reed Parry's aunts in April 2004.

Artwork
The artwork for Funeral was designed by artist and photographer Tracy Maurice, depicting a scrawling quill with foliage growing from its feathers, painted onto a piece of a wooden planter. Maurice, then a Montreal-based artist, had been introduced by a mutual friend to Win Butler, who was looking for the artwork of the band's debut album. Chassagne and Butler took a liking to Maurice's drawings and commissioned her for the task. The design was inspired by Maurice's own collection of antique photographs and early 20th-century illustrated books, as well as the aesthetics of Japanese woodblock prints and Donovan's album Barabajagal.

Release
Funeral was released in Canada and the US on September 14, 2004, and in the UK on February 28, 2005. A highly positive review from Pitchfork, which gave the album a 9.7 out of 10 rating, was frequently cited as a key factor that propelled Funeral into widespread recognition and commercial success. The album entered the Billboard 200 chart, a first for Merge Records; it was also the fastest-seller in the label's history. By November 2005, the album had sold over half a million copies worldwide, and by March 2007 it had sold nearly 750,000 copies worldwide.

The album is certified Gold by the Record Industry Association of America for over 500,000 copies sold in the US.

Critical reception

Funeral received universal acclaim from music critics and is commonly hailed as a modern classic. At Metacritic, the album has received an average score of 90, based on 33 reviews. It is put at one of the top 100 albums on Metacritic's list of highest scored albums of all time. AllMusic reviewer James Christopher Monger gave the album a rating of five stars out of five. He described it as "brave, empowering, and dusted with something that many of the indie-rock genre's more contrived acts desperately lack: an element of real danger." Rock critic Robert Christgau gave the album an A−, saying that Funeral was "...too fond of drama, but aware of its small place in the big world, and usually beautiful." Pitchfork gave the album a 9.7 out of 10 rating, and ultimately ranked the album #1 on their Top 50 Albums of 2004 list, as well as #2 on their Top 200 Albums of the 2000s list, after Radiohead's Kid A. Kludge called it a "glorious" debut album, in which Arcade Fire spins "elaborate art-rock full of passion and atmosphere."

Drowned in Sound also highly praised Funeral. Reviewer Jesus Chigley called the album "...empowering and hopeful and euphoric all at once", saying that "it says everything there is to say about mortality and it does it in 10 tracks." Styluss Josh Drimmer gave Funeral an A, calling it "celebratory, emotionally rich and life-affirming". Tiny Mix Tapes gave the album five stars out of five; "Funeral," the reviewer wrote, "is like nothing you've heard before, and altogether familiar." Reviewing the album in February 2005, Dave Simpson of The Guardian called it "one of the year's best already, by a mile." Zeth Lundy of PopMatters complimented Funeral on its eccentricity, calling it "bizarre at turns and recognizable elsewhere, equally beautiful and harrowing, theatrical and sincere, defying categorization while attempting to create new genres."  Entertainment Weekly put it on its end-of-the-decade "best-of" list, saying, "Funerals are generally somber affairs, but the Canadian indie rockers' emotionally charged 2004 debut mostly just made us smile. And, okay, mist up a little." In 2017, Canadian music magazine Exclaim! ranked fifth single "Wake Up" as the best song in the band's entire catalogue.

The album was also listed in the book 1001 Albums You Must Hear Before You Die.

Impact and legacy
"A game-changing debut", Funeral has been designated as "one of the most triumphant rock records" of all time. Stereogum ranked it as "arguably the most influential indie-rock album" of its time, while Guitar.com saw it house "some of the most deliriously euphoric anthems" of the 2000s.

Pitchforks Stuart Berman saw Funeral change Arcade Fire into "instant indie-rock icons", helping the genre shift from "a fringe movement born of economic circumstance" to "an aspirational career model". Stereogums Chris DeVille dubbed it "a how-to guide for grand, artful, [and] cathartic rock music" that turned out "impossible to replicate". He credited it with birthing future indie rock characteristics including "sing-songy" choral work, orchestral instrumentation, and more. He also saw the album popularize arena rock's granduer in the genre, replacing the "ironic detachment" of fellow indie group Pavement.

Accolades

Track listing

Personnel
Credits adapted from the liner notes of Funeral.Arcade Fire Arcade Fire – production, string arrangements, engineering, recording
 Win Butler – vocals, 12 string electric guitar, acoustic guitar, piano, synthesizer, bass
 Régine Chassagne – vocals, drums, synthesizer, piano, accordion, xylophone, recorders, percussion
 Richard Reed Parry – electric guitar, synthesizer, organ, piano, accordion, xylophone, percussion, double bass, engineering, recording
 Tim Kingsbury – bass, electric guitar, acoustic guitar
 Howard Bilerman – drums, guitar, engineer, recording
 William Butler – bass, xylophone, synthesizer, percussionAdditional personnel'

 Sarah Neufeld – violin, string arrangements
 Owen Pallett – violin, string arrangements
 Michael Olsen – cello
 Pietro Amato – horn
 Anita Fust – harp
 Sophie Trudeau – violin 
 Jessica Moss – violin 
 Gen Heistek – viola 
 Arlen Thompson – drums 
 Mark Lawson – engineering, recording
 Thierry Amar – recording assistance
 Ryan Morey – mastering
 Hilary Treadwell – photography, artwork
 Tracy Maurice – cover art

Charts

Weekly charts

Certifications

See also 
 Album era

References

Further reading

External links
 

2004 debut albums
Arcade Fire albums
Art rock albums by Canadian artists
Chamber pop albums
Baroque pop albums
Merge Records albums
Rough Trade Records albums
Albums in memory of deceased persons